The Hot Monkey is the name under which Memphis musician, Scott Taylor (The Grifters, Porch Ghouls, StickyIckyIcky, Chopper Girl and Memphis Babylon) records and performs his solo material. Taylor also runs the Memphis hip hop label, Hoodoo Labs.

Discography
  Lion (Personal Favorite/Positive Force (reissue), 1989/1996)
 recorded between 1985 and 1989
Shark b/w Depends 7-inch (Shangri-La 005, 1993)
 recorded May 1986/Summer 1985
"Sain" split 7-inch single with Linda Heck (Shangri-La 007, 1994)
 recorded 1992
  Lazy 10-inch, (Shangri-La 009, 1994)
 recorded 1994
  "Hambone's Meditations" 7-inch split with Ross Johnson & Jim Dickonson, (Sugar Ditch Records, 1995)
 ''The Hot Monkey: "Whole Lotta Shakin'"
  "More Than Lazy" (Shangri-la 020, 1996)
 recorded 1994-1996

References

External links
 Shangri-La Records Hot Monkey Page

Alternative rock groups from Tennessee
Shangri-La Records artists
Musical groups from Memphis, Tennessee